The 2012 NACAC Under-23 Championships in Athletics were held at the Centro Paralímpico Nacional in Irapuato, Mexico from 6 to 8 July. It was the seven edition of the biennial athletics competition for NACAC area athletes under 23 years of age. A total of 44 track and field events were contested, divided evenly between the sexes. It was the third time that Mexico had hosted the event, having done so in 2000 and 2008.

Over 400 athletes from 23 nations competed at the championships. Eleven championship records were broken at the competition, with particularly strong performances in the sprint events. Jason Rogers equalled the 100 metres record while Auriyall Scott improved the women's time. Kimberlyn Duncan and Rebecca Alexander made it an American sweep of the women's sprints with two more records.

Shane Brathwaite won the men's 110 metres hurdles with a record run of 13.31 seconds. Jamaica's Traves Smikle gave a strong performance in the discus throw, becoming the first athlete to clear sixty metres in the history of the meet. Amanda Bingson added more than four metres to the women's hammer throw record, while Mexico's Abigail Gomez claimed the javelin throw record for the host nation.

The United States was dominant at the competition, winning all but five of the women's titles. Mexico managed to win five gold medals and Canada had the third most wins with four golds. Sixteen nations reached the medal table

Medal summary

Men

Women

Medal table (unofficial)

Participation
According to an unofficial count, 303 athletes from 23 countries participated.

 (1)
 (2)
 (18)
 (12)
 (6)
 (3)
 (39)
 (6)
 (15)
 (2)
 (1)
 (3)
 (16)
 (73)
 (1)
 (1)
 (2)
 (4)
 (1)
 (10)
 (2)
 (79)
 (6)

References

Clavelo Robinson, Javier (2012-07-09). Fast sprinting as USA dominates NACAC Under 23 Championships. IAAF. Retrieved on 2012-07-09.
Results
2012 NACAC Under-23 Championships. Federación Mexicana de Asociaciones de Atletismo. Retrieved on 2012-07-09.

NACAC Under-23 Championships in Athletics
Ath
NACAC U23
International athletics competitions hosted by Mexico
Irapuato
Sport in Guanajuato
2012 in youth sport